is an anime television series, produced and animated by XEBEC, and directed by Seiji Mizushima. It aired from October 5, 1999, to March 28, 2000, on TV Tokyo, running for 26 episodes. 6 volumes of videos were released on VHS and DVD. The series also had a very brief run (two episodes) on Cartoon Network through Toonami's "Giant Robot Week."

The series is based around three office workers of the 21st Century Defense Security Corporation's Public Relations Division 2 who, with the company's giant robot, Dai-Guard, fight interdimensional alien beings called "Heterodynes". Unlike most giant robot anime, Dai-Guard performs on much more realistic physics, making it heavy, slow, and difficult to control. Also, the Heterodynes seem to be the least of the 21st Century Corporation's problems as they experience opposition in the form of massive damage claims, lawsuits, rivals and a jealous and antagonistic military who wishes to take back Dai-Guard for themselves.

Plot
On February 24, 2018, in the Northwest gap of the Sea of Japan, a giant creature called a Heterodyne appears and goes on a rampage, destroying a major city and killing countless people before being destroyed itself by a weapon of mass destruction known as an "O-E (Over-Explosion) bomb". In the aftermath, a giant robotic weapon system, code-named Dai-Guard, was developed for the military by the 21st Century Defense Security Corporation as an alternative to the future use of such weapons.

However, no further attacks occur for the next twelve years and the 21st Century Corporation is allowed to keep the useless weapon as a mascot which is managed by Public Relations Division 2. However, during a security exposition in 2030, a Heterodyne attacks and the ill-prepared and unarmed robot is taken into battle by its pilot Akagi Shunsuke. His headstrong nature, combined with the talents of his fellow crew, enable Dai-Guard to be victorious against multiple Heterodyne attacks causing the military to want it back.

Heterodyne are mysterious entities formed from dimensional quakes all around Japan and are attracted to electromagnetic hot spots. Crystalline hexagons called Fractal Knots act as their nucleus, and they form bodies using the matter around them. Although Fractal Knots replicate themselves indefinitely, if the original is destroyed it will immediately reduce the rest of the body into ethanol. The Heterodyne are dangerous and adaptable yet not invulnerable. They are a threat that must be faced in a dangerous world like typhoons, earthquakes or tsunami. Each one has a different physical appearance and behaviour.

Much of the series concerns the conflict between the Corporation with its office politics, profit driven, bureaucratic nature and staff beliefs, and the Anzenhosho Army (ANPO) with its adherence to protocols, procedures and concern for its public profile. Both the Corporation and the Army have people who are more concerned with ambition and status than the need to serve and protect the population. A strong theme within the story is the need for cooperation between talented individuals to achieve a common goal.

Characters
Shunsuke Akagi

The primary pilot of Dai-Guard. The headstrong, idealistic and impulsive, 25-year-old Akagi can be seen as the heart and brawn of the three Dai-Guard pilots. Beforehand, he was merely an office worker for the 21st Century Defense Security Corporation, but he manages to achieve his dreams of becoming a "Giant Robot pilot." During the return of the Heterodynes, he and his two friends Ibuki and Aoyama become the pilots of Dai-Guard and intend to put it to use in order to fight off the Heterodyne threat. Akagi loves his job a little too much and manages to stick out among his fellow workers as the more enthusiastic one. Akagi always has the best intentions, even though they usually get him into trouble. Intriguingly, his distinctive personality makes him a natural as Dai-Guard's primary pilot and his cartoon-samurai ethical code quickly wins him a place in the hearts of the public. He refuses to take or allow actions that will endanger civilian lives and/or property if there is any alternative whatsoever.
Ibuki Momoi

Years ago, during the last Heterodyne attack, Ibuki's father (a scientist whose theories predicted the appearance of the Heterodynes) was killed in the attack. Ever since that incident, Ibuki wanted revenge against the Heterodynes. She becomes the navigator of Dai-Guard for this very reason. However, she learns the less than heroic truth about her father, and it leaves her without an emotional anchor. Ibuki has a rather strained relationship with her stepfather, who at first is against Ibuki piloting Dai-Guard but becomes the person who helps her understand her father and fight her personal demons in time to save the world with much more clarity. As with Akagi, her personality meshes well with her position as Dai-Guard's navigator-she is so obsessed with details that she can make quick and precise summaries of a Heterodyne's abilities, often noticing subtle flaws in a given Heterodyne that allow the team to destroy it with minimal casualties.
Keiichiro Aoyama

Both a veritable ladies' man and somewhat mysterious, Aoyama is the engineer of Dai-Guard. Most of the time, Aoyama disappears after work, often taking off early. While his friends believe he is off womanizing, it turns out that Aoyama is caring for his sick mother, who personally does not want to become Aoyama's top priority over piloting Dai-Guard. As his experiences grow during his time piloting Dai-Guard, he meets more people from his past that he once again crosses paths with. Like his fellow pilots, he possesses personality traits that assist him in his role as Dai-Guard's engineer. Aoyama is always looking for ways to save time and effort, so not only does he regulate the robot's systems with clockwork proficiency, but he will intuitively notice methods by which the team can accomplish its goal with less effort.
Shirou Shirota

An army officer who is assigned as the Tactical Advisor to the Dai-Guard team. He is originally very strict with regulations, and insistent that civilians should not be allowed to handle the Heterodyne crisis. However, his interactions with the employees of Public Relations Division 2, especially Akagi, causes him to change his views. He eventually becomes one of their biggest supporters in the army, and often risks his own career to help them.
President Ookouchi

The president of 21st Century Defense Security. He was previously an army officer and was the one responsible for ordering the use of O-E Weapons during the Heterodyne attack twelve years ago. Because of this, he is determined to avoid the use of these weapons again and is thus very supportive of the Dai-Guard team. He was briefly voted out of office by the company's board of directors but was reinstated when the company began to flounder without him.
Haruo Oosugi

The chief and supervisor of Public Relations Division 2. He has a very easy-going personality and is always supportive of his staff.
Shinyu Yokozawa
The aid to Chief Oosugi, who also helps oversee Dai-Guards' operations. He is married with a young daughter. As his daughter has a sickly constitution, he is often concerned with the safety of his family.
Noriko Ooyama

At 28, she is the oldest of the girls that work in the Public Relations Division 2 office and is seen as an older sister figure to the other employees. Her hometown of Hiroshima helps inspire her to help people, on account of what happened to the city during the War. Among the girls employed by the division, she is the most responsible. She is often concerned about the wellbeing of Akagi, and often nags him about his work and health.
Chiaki Nakahara

Despite being the second oldest of the office girls at 25, she is very shy, easily flustered, and the shortest member of Public Relations Division 2. However, she is very dependable at doing her job, being the head of accounting for the division. She has a slight crush on Aoyama.
Fuuka Tanigawa

Tanigawa is the most outgoing of the office girls and has a hyperactive personality. She is somewhat of an office gossip, often repeating dubious information heard from other parts of the company.
Shizuku Irie

Notable for her calm demeanor, Shizuku most often speaks in a low, almost emotionless, tone. However, she occasionally, and randomly, acts out various other characters' behaviors and is known for her sarcastic remarks.
Tomoyoshi Ishizuka, Tomorou Taguchi, and Hirotaka Ijyuuin

This trio of salary men have almost identical physical appearances and personalities; all three are overweight and easygoing. They are all 27 years old and began working for the company at the same time. As a result, they work well together. Ishizuka is in charge of the office work, Taguchi is the events planner and coordinator, and Ijyuuin is in charge of domestic public relations.
Younei Sumida

The head of Dai-Guard's ground crew, who oversees the repair and maintenance of the robot. His crew is also responsible for the construction of Dai-Guard's new parts and weapons. He is often seen assisting Prof. Domeki, who he harbors feelings for.
Rika Domeki

An eccentric 17-year-old child genius, who is the head of the Technology Division, and the company's resident scientist. She insists that others refer to her as "Professor". She is an expert on the research of Heterodynes and is also the one responsible for designing new parts for Dai-Guard. She often takes advantage of Sumida's willingness to help her.

Mecha

Dai-Guard
Dai-Guard stands 25 meters high and weighs 156 tons.  It is composed of multiple pieces, which were originally transported to the site of battle, and assembled on location.  By Episode 20, the pieces were rebuilt as a fighter jet making up the head and arms, as well as two trucks making up the torso and legs, so that they can be much more easily transported until they can combine to form Dai-Guard.  Initially it was poorly maintained and essentially mothballed due to the absence of the Heterodyne threat. With their return, Dai-Guard is recommissioned and underwent several upgrades throughout the series. Due to its configuration, pilots are required to apply for a 'vertical-model special vehicle license,' which can take a minimum of 2 months to complete. It was stated that Akagi got a score of D minus, which barely made him eligible to be Dai-Guard's main pilot. Its main weapons include:
Rocket Punch: An improvised maneuver in which Dai-Guard's forearm is torn from its socket and thrown at the enemy.
Drill Arm: An arm attachment that consists of a rocket-boosted oversized drill. Unfortunately, such a weapon is in reality quite impractical as it is basically a massive gyroscope and is incredibly difficult to wield due to the torque it produces. However, the pilots eventually develop the skill to make limited use of this weapon, and it is later seen in several scenarios where other weapons are unavailable.
Net Gun: An arm attachment with the hand making up a large, weighted net used for capturing Heterodyne. Due to the lack of missions requiring the capture of live Heterodyne in the series, it is rarely ever used.
Knot Buster: An arm attachment specifically designed by Rika Domeki to strike and destroy a Heterodyne's Fractal Knot, the weak point of the creatures. It is a claw with an integral explosive-propelled pile driver, far more practical and controllable than the Drill Arm. One simply targets the Heterodyne's Fractal Knot, latches onto it with the claw and triggers the pile driver, impaling it. This weapon was only used once by Dai-Guard before being claimed by the Army for use by its own robot, Kokubogar, but was destroyed soon afterward.
Knot Punisher: Like the Knot Buster, it is designed to strike the Fractal Knot of the Heterodyne. Unknown to the Army, Domeki designed the Knot Buster merely as a prototype for this weapon. Where the Knot Buster is a single arm attachment, the Knot Punisher utilizes both arms. One arm utilizes the same pile driver-claw utility of the Knot Buster, but instead of an explosive charge, it is driven by a torque-less counter-rotating dual flywheel attached to the other arm. The flywheel is spun up in advance, the Heterodyne's Fractal Knot is grasped with the claw, and the flywheel is inserted into the pile driver's gear port, firing the spike and impaling the knot. The flywheel itself can be used as a melee weapon, as it is quite sturdy and possesses a greater radius than the arm and more stability than the drill arm. The downside with this system is that Dai-Guard cannot pick anything up with it in place, (aside from using the claw), and it takes a considerable amount of time to install the equipment prior to battle.
Great Knot Punisher (Knot Punisher 2 in English Dub): The upgraded version of the Knot Punisher, developed by Domeki with the benefit of a full year of combat data. Though it has far greater power than its predecessor, the real advantage of this system is that both arms retain hands. The pile driver attachment has twice the length of both previous systems so as to accommodate a claw on one end and a hand on the other. It can be spun on its joint to bring either manipulator to bear. Its flywheel is identical to is predecessor save that it has a hand as well, which is inserted into the gear port to fire the spike.
Insulating Armor: Special armor Dai-Guard is composed of, giving it a high resistance to electricity and electromagnetic impulses sometimes emitted from Heterodyne. In episode 15 this armor is given an electromagnetic shield to protect it from intense heat for up to three minutes.

Kokubogar
When the army realized that they could not seize the privately owned Dai-Guard, they built Kokubogar based on Dai-Guard's design to fight the Heterodynes. It was piloted by Akagi's former robot piloting class professor and two of his students. Its first battle was an outstanding success, but in the second one the Heterodyne fused with the robot with the pilot still inside who was rescued by Akagi in Dai-Guard. Repairs were completed in time for the Army to assist Dai-Guard in the final battle of the series. Its main weapons include:
Knot Buster: Originally designed for Dai-Guard, the Knot Buster was seized by the Army.  It was destroyed in its third engagement.
Machine Guns: Kokubogar had powerful machine guns mounted above the optics.
Rocket Launcher: In the final battle, Kokubogar fires a volley of rockets from its forearm, saving Dai-Guard from a certain defeat. It is uncertain if this weapon is mounted on both arms.

Heterodyne
Mysterious entities formed from dimensional quakes all around Japan. They form from crystalline hexagons called "Fractal Knots" that act as their nucleus and form into bodies using the matter around them. Although fractal knots replicate themselves indefinitely, if the original is destroyed it will immediately reduce the rest of the body into ethanol. Aside from traveling through dimensions, having Fractal Knots, and being attracted to electromagnetic hot spots, they have very little in common with each other.

Grub Type: Appears in episode 1 at the very beginning years before the main story and later in episodes 21 and 22. Powers include a heat cannon from the mouth that fires explosive yellow energy balls that range from a barrel of dynamite to rivaling napalm, swimming, armor that can survive an OE bomb, explosive melting particles from the mouth, and reformation in a matter of hours. In Super Robot Wars Z2 it is referred to as Insect-R.
Ray Type: Appears in episodes 1 and 2. Powers include swimming up to 30 knots, spawning lightning storms to indicate its arrival, twin arm whips, using its starfish-like limbs for bashing, and levitation while on land. A two headed suit of it appears briefly in episode 23 that resembles Pestar from the original Ultraman.
Saucer Type: Appears in episode 3. Powers include levitation, underside heat flashes, and using its body as a throwing disc by ramming it into opponents.
Glob Type: Appears in episode 4. Powers include being a large ball used for rolling and ramming and absorbing earth to make itself larger.
Pyramid Type: Appears in episode 5. Powers include levitation, an electrical force field, and conductive mud tentacles from the seams in the body.
Sonic Type: Appears in episode 6. Powers include levitation and a high frequency barrier around its body that dissolves solid objects although it has no effect on liquids and presumably gases.
Mushroom Type: Appears in episode 7. Powers include regeneration, sprouting mushrooms from its root-like structures, spawning thorny vines from its head, and launching needles from the head.
Balloon Type: Appears in episode 9. Powers include levitation and a highly rubbery body.
Flower Type: Appears in episode 10. Powers include swimming, immunity to radar detection, and a body composed mostly of water that allows it to dilute acids.
Fuser Type: Appears in episode 11. Powers include reducing its body to liquid, levitation, spheres around its body to protect the fractal knot, can regenerate its entire body in a matter of hours, and can fuse with opponents.
Electric Type: Appears in episode 11. Powers include phasing through solid objects, emitting electrical bolts, and flight.
Kokubogar Fusion: Appears in episodes 11 and 12. It is a fusion between Fuser Type, Kokubogar, and later Electric Type. Powers include flight, five red spheres attached to electrical pulses used like missiles from directly overhead, and extensible limbs.
Cylinder Type: Appears in episode 13. Powers include flight at 30 kilometers per hour, twin whip antennae, regeneration, and adaption to enemy attacks over time.
Magnetic Type: Appears in episode 15. Powers include floating on top of water, emitting electromagnetic waves hot enough to scorch humans alive, and tentacles from its top.
Wheel Type: Appears in episode 16. Powers include levitation, rotating fast enough to generate static electricity, and using its body rotation like a tornado.
Burrower Type: Appears in episode 17. Its only known power is burrowing 10 centimeters a year and has a body size that covers all of Kyoto. The Dai-Guard team decides not to destroy this Heterodyne, as its destruction would cause the collapse of the entire city. Suspected to have first appeared many years ago and has lain dormant since.
Spike Type: Appears in episode 18. Powers include rotating its body for burrowing long distances, emitting a high-pitched noise from its body, and using its eight retractable spikes for puncturing hard surfaces. It has also been referred to as the Central Line Monster and Subway Slayer.
Ice Type: Appears in episodes 19 and 20. Powers include flight, floating on top of water, forming a sheet of ice covering its body for armor, heat absorption, and freezing its opponents over with ice.
Starfish Type: Mentioned at the end of episode 23 and appears at the very beginning of episode 24. It possesses no known powers.
Giant Type: Appears in episodes 24, 25, and 26 and possesses the largest size of any Heterodyne with its starting size at 2 kilometers in diameter. Powers include levitation, extensible spear tentacles, can hide most of its body in the Heterodynes' home dimension, radio interference, size growth to the point of covering Earth within a month, regeneration, and spikes from the top of the body.
Black Dai-Guard: Appears in the final episode and acts as the guardian of Giant Type's fractal knot. Powers include an extensible lower half, super speed, and morphing its right hand as a drill and mace.

Media

Anime
For episode 26, the second ending theme is "Rojiura no Uchū Shōnen" by The Cobratwisters.

Merchandise
In September 2011, Bandai released Dai-Guard in the Super Robot Chogokin line. The figure comes with all of the weapons featured in the anime. Kokubogar was released as a Tamashii Web Shop exclusive in March 2012.

Video game
Dai-Guard makes its video game debut in Super Robot Wars Z2.

References

External links

1999 anime television series debuts
ADV Films
Anime with original screenplays
Super robot anime and manga
TV Tokyo original programming
Xebec (studio)
Japan in fiction
Discotek Media